Aristida benthamii is a native Australian species of grass. Found in New South Wales and Queensland.

References

benthamii
Flora of New South Wales
Flora of Queensland
Plants described in 1932